They Didn't Know is a 1936 British comedy film directed by Herbert Smith and starring Eve Gray, Leslie Perrins and Kenneth Villiers. It was made at Beaconsfield Studios as a quota quickie.

Cast
 Eve Gray as Cutie  
 Leslie Perrins as Duval  
 Kenneth Villiers as Basil Conway  
 Hope Davy as Ursula  
 John Deverell as Lord Budmarsh  
 Diana Beaumont as Pamela Budmarsh  
 C. Denier Warren as Padre  
 Patrick Ludlow as Charles Rockway  
 Maidie Hope as Lady Charfield 
 A. Scott-Gaddy 
 Hal Walters
 Fred Withers

References

Bibliography
 Low, Rachael. Filmmaking in 1930s Britain. George Allen & Unwin, 1985.
 Wood, Linda. British Films, 1927-1939. British Film Institute, 1986.

External links

1936 comedy films
1936 films
British black-and-white films
British comedy films
Films shot at Beaconsfield Studios
British Lion Films films
Films directed by Herbert Smith
Quota quickies
1930s English-language films
1930s British films